The Department of Agriculture, Fisheries and Forestry (DAFF) is an Australian government department that was created on 1 July 2022, as part of the previous Department of Agriculture, Water and the Environment.

References

Government of Australia